Seb Seliyer (lit. "tin-worker") is an Indic language spoken by Roma in Iran, but their language is distinct from that of other Roma in Iran, who speak closely related dialects. The language has largely converged on Mazandarani, but core vocabulary remains Indic.

References

Indo-Aryan languages
Language
Languages of Iran
Romani in Iran